Wan Yai is a district (amphoe) of Mukdahan province, northeastern Thailand.

Geography
Neighboring districts are (from the south clockwise) Mueang Mukdahan of Mukdahan Province and That Phanom of Nakhon Phanom province. To the east across the Mekong River is the Laotian province of Savannakhet.

The important water resource is the Mekong.

History
The minor district (king amphoe) Wan Yai was created on 16 September 1977, when the tambon Wan Yai, Pong Kham, and Bang Sai Noi were split off from Mukdahan district. In 1982 it was one of six districts which formed the new province of Mukdahan. The minor district was upgraded to a full district on 9 May 1992.

Administration 
The district is divided into five sub-districts (tambon), which are further subdivided into 44 villages (muban). There are no municipal (thesaban) areas, and four tambon administrative organization (TAO).

References

External links
amphoe.com (Thai)

Wan Yai